Klondike Kat was a cartoon produced by Total Television and originally aired as part of The Beagles on CBS-TV in 1966, and later found in the U.S. syndicated Underdog and Tennessee Tuxedo cartoon series, in between episodes as an animated short.

Plot
Klondike Kat (voiced by Mort Marshall) is an anthropomorphic wildcat Mountie. Klondike is always in pursuit of Savoir-Faire (voiced by Sandy Becker), a French-Canadian mouse who constantly steals food and is known for his catchphrase, "Savoir-Faire eez everywhere!" Savoir-Faire is accompanied by his sled dog Malamutt, who at times, plays the violin as well as the piano, is strong enough to bend steel bars (to break his boss out of jail), and has ears that can detect trouble outside, when Klondike Kat is in its presence. Malamutt's only sounds are a whimper or a growl.

Klondike Kat lives in Fort Frazzle and answers to the British-Canadian commanding officer Major Minor (modeled after Terry-Thomas), and voiced by George S. Irving.

Klondike, though well-meaning, is naturally incompetent and usually causes more trouble than Savoir-Faire in trying to stop him ("I'll make mincemeat out of that mouse!"); yet, at the end of almost each episode, Klondike would "get his mouse" somehow ("Klondike Kat always gets his mouse."). The humor in the incompetence of the main character (a recurring theme of each episode), Klondike Kat, is not unlike the humor used in Hong Kong Phooey, whose successes are only either thanks to his sidekick, Spot, who provides a solution to the challenges, or the direct result of a comically unintended side effect of his conscious efforts, and not Klondike Kat's skill as a member of the Royal Canadian Mounted Police.

References

External links
Klondike Kat at Don Markstein's Toonopedia.  from the original on December 2, 2015.

1966 American television series debuts
1960s American animated television series
1960s American police comedy television series
American children's animated comedy television series
Animated television series about cats
Yukon in fiction
Fictional Royal Canadian Mounted Police officers
Television shows set in Canada
Male characters in animation
Animated characters
Total Television